Janos Mohoss (21 June 1936 – 12 December 2020) was a Swiss fencer. He competed in the individual and team sabre events at the 1972 Summer Olympics. 

Mohoss died from COVID-19 on 12 December 2020, in Budapest during the pandemic in Hungary. He was 84.

References

External links
 

1936 births
2020 deaths
Swiss male fencers
Olympic fencers of Switzerland
Fencers at the 1972 Summer Olympics
Deaths from the COVID-19 pandemic in Hungary
Hungarian emigrants to Switzerland